Noble Health Alliance is a partnership of four Pennsylvania health systems, formed to address coordination of care and regional population health for their collective group of employees as well as enable administrative efficiency among the partners.  Formed in 2013 as a limited liability company, Noble was originally known as Pennsylvania Health Alliance and changed its name in 2014.  , the four partners are Crozer-Keystone Health System, Abington Health, Aria Health and Einstein Healthcare Network.

Corporate governance
Noble's Executive Chairman and Chief Executive Officer is Patrick R. Young, named in April 2014; Young previously worked as an executive with Aetna.  Quality management among alliance physicians is coordinated by a "physician executive council" with members from each of the alliance partners.

As of January 1, 2017, Noble Health Alliance will be dissolved.

References

2013 establishments in Pennsylvania
Hospital networks in the United States
Medical and health organizations based in Pennsylvania